An atmospheric reanalysis (also: meteorological reanalysis and climate reanalysis) is a meteorological and climate data assimilation project which aims to assimilate historical atmospheric observational data spanning an extended period, using a single consistent assimilation (or "analysis") scheme throughout.

Operational data analysis 
In operational numerical weather prediction, forecast models are used to predict future states of the atmosphere, based on how the climate system evolves with time from an initial state. The initial state provided as input to the forecast must consist of data values for a range of "prognostic" meteorological fields – that is, those fields which determine the future evolution of the model. Spatially varying fields are required in the form used by the model, for example at each intersection point on a regular grid of longitude and latitude circles, and initial data must be valid at a single time that corresponds to the present or the recent past. By contrast, the available observational data usually do not include all of the model's prognostic fields, and may include other additional fields; these data also have different spatial distribution from the forecast model grid, are valid over a range of times rather than a single time, and are also subject to observational error. The technique of data assimilation is therefore used to produce an analysis of the initial state, which is a best fit of the numerical model to the available data, taking into account the errors in the model and the data.

Uses 
In addition to initializing operational forecasts, the analyses themselves are a valuable tool for subsequent meteorological and climatological studies.  However, an operational analysis dataset, i.e. the analysis data which were used for the real-time forecasts, will typically suffer from inconsistency if it spans any extended period of time, because operational analysis systems are frequently being improved.  A reanalysis project involves reprocessing observational data spanning an extended historical period using a consistent modern analysis system, to produce a dataset that can be used for meteorological and climatological studies.

Diverse studies use reanalysis data for reproducing other climatic variables by black-box models (e.g. sea state variables).

Examples 

Examples of reanalysis datasets include the ECMWF re-analysis, the Modern-Era Retrospective analysis for Research and Applications, Version 2 (MERRA-2), and the NCEP/NCAR Reanalysis, and the JRA-25 reanalysis conducted by the Japan Meteorological Agency. In addition to these global reanalysis projects, there are also high-resolution regional reanalysis activities for different regions, e.g. for North America, Europe or Australia. Such regional reanalyses are typically based on a regional weather forecasting model and use boundary conditions from a global reanalysis.

ECMWF re-analysis

NCEP/NCAR Reanalysis

Caution in usage 
While often reanalysis can be thought as the best estimate on many variables (such as winds and temperature) of the atmosphere, its usage must be taken with caution. Degradation, replacement, or modification of instruments (e.g. satellites), as well as changes in methods of observation (e.g., surface, aloft) may create error. Not all reanalysis data are constrained by observation: some data types, such as precipitation (depending on the reanalysis) and surface evapotranspiration (for which global observations simply do not exist), are obtained by running (presumably newer) general circulation or NWP models. Reanalyses are known not to conserve moisture.

References

Reading about specific reanalyses
Kalnay, E., and coauthors, 1996: The NCEP/NCAR 40-Year Reanalysis Project. Bull. Amer. Meteor. Soc., 77, 437–471.
Kanamitsu, M., W. Ebisuzaki, J. Woolen, S.-K. Yang, J. J. Hnilo, M. Fiorino, and G. L. Potter, 2002: NCEP-DOE AMIP-II Reanalysis (R-2). Bull. Amer. Meteor. Soc., 83, 1631–1643.
Mesinger, F., and coauthors, 2006: North American Regional Reanalysis. Bull. Amer. Meteor. Soc., 87, 343–360, http://dx.doi.org/10.1175/BAMS-87-3-343.
Uppala, S., and coauthors, 2005: The ERA-40 Re-Analysis. Quart. J. Roy. Meteor. Soc., 131, 2961–3012,  https://doi.org/10.1256/qj.04.176.
Hersbach, H., Bell, B., Berrisford, P., Hirahara, S., Horányi, A., Muñoz-Sabater, J., Nicolas, J., Peubey, C., Radu, R., Schepers, D., Simmons, A., Soci, C., Abdalla, S., Abellan, X., Balsamo, G., Bechtold, P., Biavati, G., Bidlot, J., Bonavita, M., De Chiara, G., Dahlgren, P., Dee, D., Diamantakis, M., Dragani, R., Flemming, J., Forbes, R., Fuentes, M., Geer, A., Haimberger, L., Healy, S., Hogan, R. J., Hólm, E. A., Janisková, M., Keeley, S., Laloyaux, P., Lopez, P., Radnoti, G., Rosnay, P. D., Rozum, I., Vamborg, F., Villaume, S., Thépaut, J.-N., 2020: The ERA5 global reanalysis. Q J R Meteorol Soc, https://doi.org/10.1002/qj.3803.
Onogi, K., and coauthors, 2007: The JRA-25 Reanalysis. J. Meteor. Soc. Japan, 85, 369–432, https://doi.org/10.2151/jmsj.85.369.
Kaspar, F., Niermann, D., Borsche, M., Fiedler, S., Keller, J., Potthast, R., Rösch, T., Spangehl, T., and Tinz, B., 2020: Regional atmospheric reanalysis activities at Deutscher Wetterdienst: review of evaluation results and application examples with a focus on renewable energy, Adv. Sci. Res., 17, 115–128, https://doi.org/10.5194/asr-17-115-2020.
Khatibi, A.; Krauter, S. Validation and Performance of Satellite Meteorological Dataset MERRA-2 for Solar and Wind Applications. Energies 2021, 14, 882. https://doi.org/10.3390/en14040882

See also
 Ocean reanalysis

External links
lecture notes from the European Centre for Medium-Range Weather Forecasts
 Atmospheric Reanalyses Comparison Table from Reanalysis.org

Climate and weather statistics
Meteorological data and networks
Numerical climate and weather models
Statistical forecasting
Weather prediction